is a Japanese speed skater who competes internationally.
 
He participated at the 2018 Winter Olympics.

Personal records

References

External links

1994 births
Living people
Japanese male speed skaters
Olympic speed skaters of Japan
Speed skaters at the 2018 Winter Olympics
Speed skaters at the 2017 Asian Winter Games
Medalists at the 2017 Asian Winter Games
Asian Games medalists in speed skating
Asian Games silver medalists for Japan
Universiade gold medalists for Japan
Universiade medalists in speed skating
Competitors at the 2013 Winter Universiade